The AN/APG-79 is a variant of an active electronically scanned array (AESA) radar developed for the United States Navy's Boeing F/A-18E/F Super Hornet and Boeing EA-18G Growler aircraft, providing a high level of aircrew situational awareness. The beam of the AESA radar provides fast track updates and multi-target tracking capability. The APG-79 AESA uses transmit/receive (TR) modules populated with gallium arsenide monolithic microwave integrated circuits (MMIC). In the F/A-18E/F, the radar is installed in a slide-out nose rack to facilitate maintenance. 

The APG-79 features an entirely solid-state antenna construction, which improves reliability, durability, and reduces the cost compared to a traditional radar system.

The radar has a range of up to 150 km (80 nm) and multi-target tracking capabilities.

The APG-79 is compatible with current F/A-18 weapon loads and enables aircrew to fire weapons such as the AIM-120 AMRAAM, and simultaneously guide several missiles to several targets widely spaced in azimuth, elevation or range.

The APG-79 radar completed formal operational evaluation (OPEVAL) testing in December 2006.  As of January 2007, the radar was installed in 28 aircraft; some aircraft were experiencing software problems but that issue was expected to be resolved by the end of the fiscal year 2007. As of July 2008, Raytheon had delivered 100 APG-79 sets to the United States Navy; on 3 June 2008, the Navy received the first APG-79-equipped Boeing EA-18G Growler. The Navy expects to order approximately 437 production radars.

In January 2013, the Director, Operational Test & Evaluation (DOT&E) disclosed a long history of problems for the APG-79 radar in its initial operational testing.

In December 2020, Raytheon offered AN/APG-79 for retrofitting the F/A-18 C/D. In July 2021 the United States Marine Corps selected AN/APG-79(V)4 with gallium nitride (GaN) transmitters to upgrade their fleet of F/A-18 fighters. The new radar was flight-tested in May 2022.

The APG-79B4 version is slated to be installed inverted on the B-52 during its Commercial Engine Replacement Program (CERP)

In 2022 Malaysia chose the APG-79(V)4 for the upgrade of their fleet of F/A-18C/D Hornets and the newly purchased FA-50 Golden Eagle

See also 
 AN/APG-65 radar family
 AN/APG-82

References

External links 
 Raytheon products website

Aircraft radars
Military electronics of the United States
Radars of the United States Air Force
Raytheon Company products
Military equipment introduced in the 2000s